Michael Wright is an American film and television actor, who is best known for his role as Eddie King Jr. in the 1991 Robert Townsend film The Five Heartbeats, Carlyle in Streamers (1983), and Raynathan in Sugar Hill (1994). and known for his television roles such as Elias Taylor in V (The Series) (1984-1985), Omar White in Oz (2001-2003), and Lazarus Prime in Black Lightning (2019).

Career
Wright's body of work in television includes the 1983 NBC science fiction miniseries V, the 1984 sequel V: The Final Battle, and V: The Series as Elias Taylor. He appeared in the  1987 episode "Duty and Honor" of Miami Vice as "The Savage", and on the 1997 HBO series Oz as Omar White from 2001-2003.  Wright has appeared on New York Undercover, and as Lazarus Prime on Black Lightning.

Wright's film roles include the 1987 drama The Principal as Victor Duncan, also starring  James Belushi, and the 1994 film Sugar Hill with Wesley Snipes. He played Clinton, the leader of The Del Bombers gang in the cult film The Wanderers. His most recent film is 2005's The Interpreter. Wright was born and raised in New York City. He is a graduate of the New Lincoln School.

Filmography
 The Wanderers (1979) as Clinton
 Streamers (1983) as Carlyle
 V (miniseries) (1983) as Elias Taylor (2 episodes)
 V: The Final Battle (1984) as Elias Taylor (3 episodes)
 V (The Series) (1984–1985) as Elias Taylor (13 episodes)
 The Laundromat as Shooter Stevens
 Bedtime Eyes (1987) as Spoon
 The Principal (1987) as Victor Duncan
 Private Times (1991)
 The 5 Heartbeats (1991) as Eddie King Jr.
 Sugar Hill (1994) as Raynathan "Ray" Skuggs
 New York Undercover (1996) as Rene Mazili
 The Cottonwood (1996) as Simon Z.
 Money Talks (1997) as Aaron
 Point Blank (1998) as Sonny
 Rage (1999) as "B-Boy"
 Piñero (2001) as Edgar Bowser
 Oz (2001–2003) as Omar White (22 episodes)
 Batman: Dark Tomorrow (2003) (VG) as Black Mask (voice)
 Downtown: A Street Tale (2004) as Rudy
 The Interpreter (2005) as Marcus
 Before I Self Destruct (2009) as First Victim
 Rel (2018) as Mr. Donaldson
 Black Lightning (2019) as Lazarus Prime (2 episodes)

References

External links
 

Living people
African-American male actors
American male film actors
American male television actors
Lee Strasberg Theatre and Film Institute alumni
Male actors from New York City
Volpi Cup for Best Actor winners
Year of birth missing (living people)
21st-century African-American people